Ujarulvar  is a village in Kasaragod district in the state of Kerala, India.

Demographics
As of 2011 Census, Ujarulvar had a population of 1,328 with 591 males and 737 females. The average sex ratio was 1247 higher than the state average of 1084. In Ujarulvar, 15.1% of the population was under 6 years of age. Ujarulvar had an average literacy of 83.9% higher than the national average of 74% and lower than state average of 94%.

References

Suburbs of Kasaragod